Victor Fayod (23 November 1860 – 28 April 1900) was a Swiss mycologist, who created an influential novel classification of the agaric fungi and who described a number of new genera and species.

Biographical overview
Fayod was born on 23 November 1860 in Salaz, which is a small locality close to Bex in the Swiss canton of Vaud.  He was a grandson of a famous Swiss geologist, Johann von Charpentier.  After attending school in Bex and Lausanne, he studied Mathematics and later Silviculture at Zürich polytechnic.  He was strongly interested in botany and mycology, but his work in those areas had to be conducted in a private capacity.

Fayod first worked with Heinrich Anton de Bary (1831–1888) in Strasbourg from 1881 to 1882, then as a tutor.  He took a series of biology-related posts in Bad Cannstatt, Normandy, Nervi, the "Valli Valdesi" (in the Cottian Alps), and Genoa.  He also assisted French bacteriologist André Chantemesse (1851–1919) in Paris.  After working in a dental laboratory in Paris in 1890, he decided to take on dentistry as an alternative less precarious career and became qualified as a dental surgeon at the Paris faculty of medicine.  However health problems soon caused him to return to Switzerland and his illness continued until his death on 28 April 1900.

Scientific Achievements
Fayod mastered French, German and Italian and produced scientific papers in all three languages.  A bibliography of his work can be found at the end of the Swiss Academy of Natural Sciences reference.

He recognized the influence of Darwinism on botany and devised a new classification of the gilled fungi, based for the first time on microscopic features such as basidia, cystidia and spores.  He presented this classification in his most important work, "Prodrome d'une histoire naturelle des agaricinées" ("Prodrome of a Natural History of the Agarics"), in which he proposed some new generic designations which are still in use today: Agrocybe, Cystoderma, Delicatula, Omphalotus, Pholiotina, and Schinzinia.   These genera, which bear his name as originating author, are the main reason that Fayod is still remembered.  Some of them are well-known, containing common species, whilst others are less so.  He also proposed many other new genus names which have not stood the test of time.

Fayod's work focused primarily on the Hymenomycetes.  One major result was his description of spore discharge in the basidiomycetes involving the formation of a drop of liquid.  He left a collection of biological illustrations and other items which are preserved in the Conservatoire and Botanical Gardens of Geneva.

The genus Fayodia (of fungi in the family Tricholomataceae), was named in his honour in 1930, as was the species Pluteus fayodii (which may be only a synonym of Pluteus leoninus).

References

1860 births
1900 deaths
Swiss mycologists